The United Bank International Soccer Festival was a pre-season association football tournament hosted in South Africa during the 1990s. The tournament was sponsored by the South African bank United Bank and organised by the South African Football Association's marketing partner Awesome Sports International.

1993

1994 

South African soccer friendly trophies